The Anglican Church of St Peter in North Wootton, Somerset, England was built in the 14th or 15th century. It is a Grade II* listed building.

History

A chapel existed in North Wootton in the 12th century under the control of the church in Pilton.

The current church was built in the 14th and 15th centuries and a Victorian restoration in the 19th when the chancel was rebuilt.

The parish is part of the benefice of Pilton with Croscombe, North Wootton and Dinder within the Diocese of Bath and Wells.

Architecture

The small stone church has a nave and chancel each of two-bays. There is a sundial over the porch is dated 1767.

Inside the church are 15th century benches and a Norman font.

See also  
 List of ecclesiastical parishes in the Diocese of Bath and Wells

References

Grade II* listed buildings in Mendip District
Grade II* listed churches in Somerset